Mimi Onalaja (born 25 September 1990) is a Nigerian actress, TV host, writer, presenter, actress, blogger, model, media and television personality. She was born in Lagos. Her mother who had a full time job took care of her and her siblings because her dad was in the army and moved around a lot. She is the host of 'The Future Awards Africa'. Mimi also hosted the ELOY awards in 2016. Mimi joined EbonyLife TV, an entertainment television station in 2014. Mimi worked in a corporate organization before joining the media world which has been her dreams from her early years.

Early life and education
Mimi Onalaja was born in Lagos to Nigerian parents. She hails from Ago-Iwoye, Ogun State. She had her elementary school at Kemsing School International, Ikoyi, and her Secondary School education at Queen's College, Lagos, before proceeding to Covenant University, Ota, Ogun State, where she completed her bachelor's degree in International Relations, in 2010. In 2013, Mimi completed a Diploma in Acting for Film from the New York Film Academy.

Career
Mimi is a TV host who produces and hosts TV shows at EbonyLife TV. She is the host of 'Game Show' and 'Play to Win'. Prior to joining EbonyLife TV in 2014, Mimi worked at Nemesia Studios as a production manager. Her first opportunity on TV was facilitated by Mo Abudu with zero experience which still surprises to date. In addition to being a TV host, Mimi is also a lover of fashion/style, travel, food, family, and friendship. She has a column on 'Style Vitae'.

Mimi is also an actress. She is known for her role in the 2020 movies, Smart Money Woman and Shades of Love Edit (2018).

she also hosted a program by Amstel Malta and Tecno in celebration of international women's Day 2022.

Meanwhile, Mimi started her career as an HR consultant in one of the big four accounting/consulting firms. But two months into the job, she became dissatisfied and started thinking of the right job for her. However, she spent 16 months in the corporate firm gaining professional skills she would not trade for anything before she went into the media. Her sudden change of career was not approved by her father at the initial stage but her mother supported her. Later, her father agreed with them and even paid for her journey through film school.

Media shows hosted 

 Game Show
 Play to Win
 The Future Awards Africa'. 
 ELOY awards

Movies 

 Smart Money Woman
 Shades of Love Edit

References

Nigerian female models
21st-century Nigerian actresses
1990 births
Nigerian television personalities
Living people
Nigerian film actresses
Nigerian television actresses
Yoruba female models
Yoruba women television personalities
Yoruba actresses
Covenant University alumni
Nigerian models
Actresses from Lagos State
Nigerian women bloggers
Nigerian television producers
Nigerian television talk show hosts
Nigerian television presenters
Nigerian women writers
New York Film Academy alumni